The 2012 Vuelta a Murcia was the 28th edition of the Vuelta a Murcia cycle race and was held on 3 March to 4 March 2012. The race started in Archena and finished in Murcia. The race was won by Nairo Quintana.

General classification

References

2012
2012 in road cycling
2012 in Spanish sport